Edwin is a 1984 British television film directed by Rodney Bennett and starring Alec Guinness, Renée Asherson and Paul Rogers.

A recently retired high court judge now living in the English countryside, spurred by the coming visit from Canada of his son Edwin, at last confronts his long-standing suspicions of his wife's infidelity.

Cast
 Alec Guinness as Sir Fennimore Truscott
 Renée Asherson as Lady Margaret Truscott
 Paul Rogers as Thomas Marjoriebanks

References

Bibliography
 Robert Tanitch. Guinness. Harrap, 1989.

External links
 

1984 television films
1984 films
Channel 4 television films
Television shows produced by Anglia Television
1980s English-language films
1980s British films
British drama television films